Machinery refers to mechanical machines.

Machinery may also refer to:

 Agricultural machinery, machinery used in agriculture
 Cotton-spinning machinery, machinery used to spin cotton
 Stage machinery, mechanical devices used in stage productions
 Machinery of government, processes of government

See also 
 Machineri